Zaklonišče prepeva is a Slovenian rock band from Nova Gorica founded in 1994. Most of their lyrics are in Serbo-Croatian and contain certain amounts of yugo-nostalgia.

They published their first album, Nešto kao Džimi Hendrix (Something like Jimi Hendrix) in 1996. Zaklonišče prepeva became famous after creating an adaptation of Rani Mraz's Računajte na nas.

Their third album, Glasajte za nas (Vote for us), was controversial as the television video for the song Vote for us was banned prior to Slovenian elections in 2000. The reasoning was that their fictional candidate, Kradimir Pendreković (Thief Nightstick) might have resembled some real candidates.

Discography 
Nešto kao Džimi Hendrix, Shelter Records/Panika 1996
Novo vreme - stare dileme, Shelter Records/NIKA 1998
Glasajte za nas, Shelter Records/NIKA 1999
Odoh majko u rokere, Nika Records, 2001
Sellam Alejkum, Menart Records, 2004
Bolje ne bo nikoli, Lip Art, 2009
Samo da prođe demokratija, Lip Art, 2014

External links
Official website

Slovenian rock music groups
Musical groups established in 1994